Limit theorem may refer to:
 Central limit theorem, in probability theory
 Edgeworth's limit theorem, in economics
 Plastic limit theorems, in continuum mechanics

Mathematics disambiguation pages